Capital punishment in Uzbekistan has been abolished.

On August 1, 2005, President Islam Karimov signed a decree stating that “the death penalty shall be cancelled in the Republic of Uzbekistan as of January 1, 2008, as a form of criminal punishment and shall be replaced by sentence for life or long prison terms”.
The reason given for the three-year delay  was the need to build new prisons to house people condemned to life terms instead of death.

The last execution in Uzbekistan took place in 2005.

References

 

2008 disestablishments in Uzbekistan
Uzbekistan
Human rights abuses in Uzbekistan